East Hall High School is a four-year comprehensive high school located in the eastern portion of Hall County, Georgia, United States. The school is operated by  Hall County Schools, and serves the communities of Lula, Gainesville, and Gillsville.

About East Hall

East Hall High School is located just outside Gainesville, Georgia, in northeastern Hall County, about 60 miles northeast of Atlanta. East Hall is set in a rural area where many families are blue collar workers, representing almost entirely middle-class families. Hall County is commonly known as the poultry capital of the world. The students, parents, faculty, and administration of East Hall High School strive to have an outstanding educational program.

Administration
Jeff Cooper - Principal
Dr. Renee Carey - Asst. Principal
Micah Hoyt - Asst. Principal
Adam Rich - Asst. Principal

Adjacent schools
 Northeast - White County High School
 Northwest - North Hall High School
 West - Gainesville High School
 Southwest - Johnson High School
 Southeast - Jackson County Comprehensive High School
 East - Banks County High School

Academics
 Honors and AP courses are available.
 The student-teacher ratio is 12:1.

Demographics
White/Caucasian - 35%
Black - 19%
Hispanic - 45%
Asian - 1%

Extracurricular activities
 Academic Team
 Beta
 Cheerleading
 DECA
 FBLA
 FCA
 FFA
 HOSA
 JHBA
 Marching Band
 National Honor Society
National Thespian Society

Athletics
In recent years the East Hall Vikings have qualified for the Class AAA State Playoffs in at least two sports each year, with several Final Four and state appearances. The sports offered at East Hall are football, softball, volleyball, wrestling, baseball, tennis, cross country, track and field, men's basketball, ladies' basketball, men's soccer, and ladies' soccer. East Hall has numerous state titles in men's and ladies' basketball.

East Hall Viking Band
The band program averages nearly 15% participation by the student body. In 1992, the East Hall High School Viking Marching Band was proclaimed "Grand Champion" of the Fort Mountain Marching Contest in Chatsworth, Georgia, winning first place in every caption of the event. In 1993 and 1994, the Viking Band won the Sweepstakes Trophy at the Dixieland Classic in Covington, Georgia. Since 1995, the Viking Marching Band has participated in the Georgia Mountain Marching Festival, and has won the Sweepstakes Trophy in every performance. On two occasions the band has won first place in the National Cherry Blossom Festival Parade. In 2007, the Viking Band won "Best In Class" in the Cotton Bowl Parade in Dallas, Texas. The band placed 2nd in AAA competition at the 2008 Georgia Bandmasters Championship in Canton, Georgia.

The band has performed in the Tournament of Roses Parade, the Cotton Bowl Parade, the Orange Bowl Halftime and Parade Performances, the Philadelphia Thanksgiving Day Parade, the National Cherry Blossom Festival Parade, The Nations Day Parade in New York City, the Macy's Holiday Parade in Orlando, Florida, the Outback Bowl Halftime Performance and Parade, the Macy's Egleston Christmas Parade, and the King Orange Jamboree Parade. It has also performed halftime shows for the Atlanta Falcons and performed several times at Walt Disney World. The band was proclaimed "Ambassadors of Good Will" from the state of Georgia by Governor Joe Frank Harris.

The marching band is divided into three concert organizations and both are entered in concert festival each year sponsored by the Georgia Music Educators Association. Since 1971, the East Hall High School Concert Bands have made 63 superior ratings and 9 excellent ratings in concert festival. Additionally, the Symphonic Band performed at events such as the Georgia Music Educators In-Service Conference, the Southern Association of Colleges and Schools Annual Conference, and the University of Georgia's January Music Festival.

In the fall of 2004, band director Craig Cantrell formed the East Hall High School Wind Symphony. All concert organizations, Beginning Band, Concert Band, Symphonic Band, and Wind Symphony, are conducted by Cantrell.

Under the direction of  Cantrell, the East Hall Bands routinely receive superior ratings in marching contests and music festivals. The Viking Marching Band has performed in numerous nationally televised parades and events. Very few high school bands have amassed such an impressive array of honors and performances throughout the country.

Notable alumni 
 Sandra Dunagan Deal (1960), First Lady of Georgia from 2011 to 2019
 Brenda Hill-Gilmore (1983), NAIA Basketball Player of the Year 1987

External links
 School
 Band

References

Educational institutions established in 1957
Gainesville, Georgia
Public high schools in Georgia (U.S. state)
Schools in Hall County, Georgia
1957 establishments in Georgia (U.S. state)